Prunus domestica is a species of flowering plant in the family Rosaceae. A deciduous tree, it includes many varieties of the fruit trees known as plums in English, though not all plums belong to this species. The greengages and damsons also belong to subspecies of P. domestica.

Its hybrid parentage was believed to be Prunus spinosa and P. cerasifera; however recent cytogenetic evidence seem to implicate 2×, 4×, 6× P. cerasifera as the sole wild stock from which the cultivated 6× P. domestica could have evolved.

Description

Typically it forms a large shrub or a small tree. It may be somewhat thorny, with white blossom, borne in early spring. The pulp is usually sweet, but some varieties are sour. Like all Prunus fruits, it contains a single large seed, usually called a stone, which is discarded when eating.

Taxonomy

Subspecies 
Cullen et al. (1995) recognises three subspecies, though scientific studies favor a more fine-grained separation:

The subspecies cross easily, so that numerous intermediate forms can be found: their sweetness and tartness may vary, their colors varying from bluish-purple to red, orange, yellow or light green.

Cultivars 

Numerous cultivars have been selected for garden use. The following have gained the Royal Horticultural Society's Award of Garden Merit:

Uses

The pulp is edible and usually sweet, though some varieties are sour and require cooking with sugar to make them palatable.

Plums are grown commercially in orchards, but modern rootstocks, together with self-fertile strains, training and pruning methods, allow single plums to be grown in relatively small spaces. Their early flowering and fruiting means that they require a sheltered spot away from frosts and cold winds.

Most prunes (dried plums) are made from fruits of this species.

Notes

References

External links

 
 
 

Plants described in 1753
Taxa named by Carl Linnaeus
domestica
domestica
Flora of Europe
Flora of Asia
Fruit trees